Events from the year 1960 in Denmark.

Incumbents
 Monarch – Frederick IX
 Prime minister – H. C. Hansen (until 19 February), Viggo Kampmann

Events
 15 November – The 1960 parliamentary election is held.
 28 November – The Danish Academy is founded.

Sports

Badminton
 1923 March  All England Badminton Championships
 Erland Kops wins gold in Men's Single
 Erland Kops and Poul-Erik Nielsen win gold in Men's Double
 Finn Kobberø and Kirsten Thorndahl win gold medal in Mixed Double.

Date unknown
  Emile Severeyns (BEL) and Rik Van Steenbergen (BEL) win the Six Days of Copenhagen sox-day track cycling race.

Births
 15 April – Susanne Bier, film director
 8 July – Susanne Nielsson, breaststroke swimmer
 29 October – Jens Winther, jazz trumpeter (died 2011)

Deaths
 21 January – Launy Grøndahl, composer and conductor (born 1886)
 27 January – Gudmund Hatt, archaeologist and cultural geographer (born 1884)
 19 February – H. C. Hansen, politician and Prime Minister 1955–60 (born 1906)
 27 March – Holger Jacobsen, architect (born 1876)
 18 April – C. L. David, lawyer, art collector and philanthropist (born 1878)
 24 June – Harald Moltke, nobleman, painter and author (born 1871)
 16 August – Christine Swane, painter associated with the "Funen Painters" (born 1876)
 26 August – Knud Enemark Jensen, racing cyclist (born 1936)
 1 September – Knud Heglund, actor (born 1894)
 11 December – Svend Rindom, (screen)writer and actor (born 1884)
 12 December – Jens Peter Dahl-Jensen, sculptor and ceramist, model master of Bing & Grøndahl 1897–1917, artistic director of Norden 1917–1925 (born 1874)
 22 December – Sophus Black, telegraph manager and art collector (born 1882)

See also
1960 in Danish television

References

 
Denmark
Years of the 20th century in Denmark
1960s in Denmark